Island Park Dam is operated by the U.S. Bureau of Reclamation in Fremont County, Idaho, United States.  The dam lies in Targhee National Forest near Island Park. The zoned earthfill dam was built between 1937 and 1939 as part of the Minidoka Project, which provides water to irrigate farmland in Idaho's Snake River Plain.

The dam provides only water storage, impounding , which is distributed by the Cross Cut Canal to farms in Fremont and Madison counties in Idaho, and Teton County in Wyoming. The Island Park and Grassy Lake reservoirs were built as an alternative to construction of a larger project that would have flooded the Falls River area of Yellowstone National Park.

Climate
Island Park Dam has a humid continental climate (Köppen Dfb) bordering upon a subalpine climate (Dfc). Summers feature very warm afternoons and chilly mornings, whilst winters are freezing and very snowy with an annual snowfall averaging  and reaching  between July 1974 and June 1975.

References

External links
 Island Park Dam at the Bureau of Reclamation

Dams in Idaho
Buildings and structures in Fremont County, Idaho
Minidoka Project
United States Bureau of Reclamation dams
Dams completed in 1939
1939 establishments in Idaho